Žiga Pešut (born October 5, 1992) is a Slovenian professional ice hockey player. He is currently playing for the Les Aigles de Nice of the French Ligue Magnus and Slovenia national team.

Pešut started playing hockey for his hometown team HDK Maribor. At age 16 he moved to Sweden to play for Grums IK of the Division 2. From 2010 to 2013 Pešut spent three seasons playing in the Czech Republic before signing a deal with Erste Bank Hockey League (EBEL) team HDD Olimpija. After four seasons he joined German club EHC Bayreuth of the DEL2. From 2018 to 2021 he played for Olimpija Ljubljana. At the beginning of 2022, he signed for Herlev Eagles in the top Danish division and at the beginning of 2023, he signed for the French team Les Aigles de Nice.

Youth career

In 2007, Pešut began playing for the U19 team of his hometown HDK Maribor. Next season he played also for HDK Maribor's second team and represented Slovenia at the U18 World Championship Division II.

He experienced playing abroad for the first time in 2009/10 season in which he played for Grums IK U18, U20 and first selection. At the U18 World Championship Division II he was Slovenia's best scorer.

From 2010 until 2012 Pešut played for Czech U20 teams HC Slezan Opava and BK Mladá Boleslav. In both seasons he was part of Slovenia's U20 team at the 2011 World Junior Championship Division I and 2012 World Junior Championship Division I.

Professional career

In 2012-13 he was loaned to NED Hockey Nymburk. Next season Pešut returned to his home country and played first professional year as a member of HDD Olimpija helping them to win the national title. 2014-15 was the season he was called to the senior national team for the first time.

The following season, 2015–16, Pešut was HDD Olimpija's leading scorer by points and goals scored in Erste Bank Hockey League. In the same season HDD Olimpija won Slovenian Ice Hockey League and Slovenian Ice Hockey Cup. In 2016 he was part of the Slovenian national ice hockey team which gained promotion from World Championship Division I to Ice Hockey World Championships at the tournament in Poland.

After another season in Ljubljana, he signed contract for the 2017–18 with the DEL2 team EHC Bayreuth.

In 2018, Olimpija Ljubljana announced they have signed Pešut. In this season they beat HC Pustertal in the AHL finals 4-3 after trailing 1-3 after first four games. Pešut also won the Slovenian national championship with the team, having scored in both finals games. At the beginning of the 2019–20 season Olimpija Ljubljana won Slovenian Ice Hockey Cup. In 2020-21 the club won AHL once again, with Pešut providing most points for the team in the finals against Asiago Hockey 1935.

Career statistics

Regular season and playoffs

International

Awards and honours

References

1992 births
Living people
Slovenian ice hockey forwards
HDD Olimpija Ljubljana players
HK Olimpija players
Sportspeople from Maribor
Herlev Eagles players
Les Aigles de Nice players
EHC Bayreuth players
Slovenian expatriate ice hockey people
Slovenian expatriate sportspeople in Sweden
Slovenian expatriate sportspeople in Germany
Slovenian expatriate sportspeople in Denmark
Slovenian expatriate sportspeople in France
Slovenian expatriate sportspeople in the Czech Republic
Expatriate ice hockey players in Sweden
Expatriate ice hockey players in Germany
Expatriate ice hockey players in Denmark
Expatriate ice hockey players in France
Expatriate ice hockey players in the Czech Republic